Sydney Mushanga (born 26 April 1977) is a Zambian politician. He currently serves as Member of the National Assembly for Bwacha, as well as the Minister for Central Province.

Biography
Prior to entering politics he worked as an IT specialist and as a teacher. Ahead of the 2011 general elections he was selected as the Patriotic Front (PF) candidate for Bwacha ahead of the sitting MP Gladys Nyirongo, and was subsequently elected to the National Assembly. He was re-elected in 2016, beating out United Party for National Development (UPND) rival Saidi Chibwana.

After serving as Deputy Minister of Education, Vocational Training and Early Education for a little over a year, President Edgar Lungu appointed him Minister for Central Province in late 2016.

References

Living people
1977 births
Zambian educators
Patriotic Front (Zambia) politicians
Members of the National Assembly of Zambia
Provincial Ministers of Zambia
21st-century Zambian politicians